The 2015 Total Spa 24 Hours was the 67th running of the Spa 24 Hours. It was also the fourth round of the 2015 Blancpain Endurance Series season and was held on 25 and 26 July at the Circuit de Spa-Francorchamps, Belgium.

The race was won by BMW Sports Trophy Team Marc VDS and drivers Nick Catsburg, Lucas Luhr and Markus Palttala. The trio's No. 46 BMW Z4 GT3 finished a lap clear of Audi Sport Team WRT and their No. 2 Audi R8 LMS, driven by Nico Müller, Stéphane Ortelli and Frank Stippler. Completing the podium in third place was the No. 5 Audi Sport Phoenix Racing Audi R8 LMS ultra of Christian Mamerow, Christopher Mies and Nicki Thiim, two laps down on the winners.

In the race's other classes, the No. 47 AF Corse Ferrari 458 Italia GT3 of Gianmaria Bruni, Pasin Lathouras, Stéphane Lemeret and Alessandro Pier Guidi were the winners of the Pro-Am Cup in fourth place overall, while the Cup for amateur drivers was won by the No. 24 Audi R8 LMS ultra of Team Parker Racing, driven by Ian Loggie, Callum MacLeod, Benny Simonsen and Julian Westwood.

Race result

References

Spa 24 Hours
Spa
Spa